Tepetarla may refer to:

 Örnekköy, a village in Beykoz district of Istanbul Province, Turkey
 Tepetarla, Bayburt, a village in the District of Bayburt, Bayburt Province, Turkey